Melarhaphe is a monotypic genus of sea snails, marine gastropod mollusks in the family Littorinidae, the winkles or periwinkles.

Species
Species within the genus Melarhaphe include:
 Melarhaphe neritoides (Linnaeus, 1758)
Species brought into synonymy
 Melarhaphe blanfordi Dunker, 1871: synonym of Littoraria articulata (Philippi, 1846)
 Melarhaphe induta (Westerlund, 1898): synonym of Melarhaphe neritoides (Linnaeus, 1758)
 Melarhaphe oliveri Finlay, 1930: synonym of Austrolittorina antipodum (Philippi, 1847)
 Melarhaphe scabra (Linnaeus, 1758): synonym of Littoraria scabra (Linnaeus, 1758)
 Melarhaphe subgranosa Dunker in Dunker & Zelebor, 1866: synonym of Echinolittorina leucosticta (Philippi, 1847)
 Melarhaphe undulata (Gray, 1839): synonym of Littoraria undulata (Gray, 1839)
 Melarhaphe zelandiae Finlay, 1927: synonym of Austrolittorina cincta (Quoy & Gaimard, 1833)

References

 Reid, D.G. (1986). The littorinid molluscs of mangrove forests in the Indo-Pacific region. British Museum (Natural History), London
 Reid, D. G. 1989. The Comparative Morphology, Phylogeny and Evolution of the Gastropod Family, Littorinidae. Philosophical Transactions of the Royal Society B, 324: 1-110.

Littorinidae